Bujeba, or Kwasio, may refer to:
the Bujeba people
the Bujeba language